Torran Blake Nixon (born February 24, 1962 in Eugene, Oregon) is a former professional American football cornerback in the National Football League for the San Francisco 49ers.  He played college football at San Diego State University and was drafted in the second round of the 1985 NFL Draft by the Washington Redskins.

In April 2019, Nixon was named President of Umpqua Bank. Previously Nixon served as division president and managing director for California Bank & Trust in San Diego and Northern California. He also played for the San Francisco 49ers from 1985-1989 and was a member of the Super Bowl XXIII championship team over the Cincinnati Bengals. Nixon holds a Master of Business Administration from the University of Southern California.

References

1962 births
Living people
American football cornerbacks
San Diego State Aztecs football players
San Francisco 49ers players
Sportspeople from Eugene, Oregon
Players of American football from Oregon